The President of Oberlin College is the chief administrator of both Oberlin College and Oberlin Conservatory of Music.  Each is appointed by and is responsible to the other members of that body, who delegate to him or her the day-to-day running of the university. The current incumbent is Carmen Twillie Ambar. As part of Oberlin's inherent mission of a vastly interdisciplinary education, presidents have been chosen from a wide range of fields as diverse as musical performance (Starr), theology (Finney) physics (Fuller), law (Krislov), athletics (Stevenson) and pure mathematics (King). Thus, each president is a qualified academic professor who has the opportunity to teach classes.

Presidents of Oberlin College
 Asa Mahan, 1835–1850 
 Charles Grandison Finney, leader in the Second Great Awakening, president 1851–1866
 James Fairchild, 1866–1889
 William Gay Ballantine, 1891–1896
 John Henry Barrows, 1899–1902
 Henry Churchill King, 1902–1927
 Ernest H. Wilkins, 1927–1946
 William Stevenson, 1946–1960
 Robert K. Carr, 1960–1969
 Robert W. Fuller, 1970–1974
 Emil Danenberg, 1975–1982
 S. Frederick Starr, 1983–1994 
 Nancy Dye, 1994–2007
 Marvin Krislov, 2007–2017
 Carmen Twillie Ambar, 2017–present

References

Presidents of Oberlin College